Aspidosperma populifolium is a tree native to Brazil, which is typical of Caatinga vegetation. In addition, it is useful for beekeeping. It was first described by Alphonse Pyrame de Candolle in 1844.

See also
List of honey plants
List of plants of Caatinga vegetation of Brazil

References

populifolium
Trees of Brazil